Alessandro Mangiarratti (born 15 September 1978) is a Swiss football coach and a former defender. He last coached FC Vaduz.

Coaching career
On 23 December 2021, Mangiarratti was hired as the head coach by FC Vaduz until the summer of 2023. At the start of the 2022–23 season, he made history by leading Vaduz to qualification to the group stage of the Europa Conference League, the first Liechtensteiner club to qualify for a European tournament. Despite this international success, the team was struggling in the league. Due to the intense schedule, Mangiarratti decided to step down from his position as coach on 16 November 2022.

References

External links
AC Bellinzona profile 

1978 births
Living people
Swiss men's footballers
Swiss expatriate footballers
AC Bellinzona players
FC Schaffhausen players
FC Wil players
Grasshopper Club Zürich players
FC Locarno players
C.F. Os Belenenses players
Expatriate footballers in Portugal
Atlas F.C. footballers
Expatriate footballers in Mexico
People from Bellinzona
Swiss expatriate sportspeople in Portugal
Swiss expatriate sportspeople in Mexico
Liga MX players
Primeira Liga players
Association football defenders
Swiss football managers
FC Chiasso managers
BSC Young Boys non-playing staff
FC Vaduz managers
Swiss expatriate football managers
Expatriate football managers in Liechtenstein
Swiss expatriate sportspeople in Liechtenstein
Sportspeople from Ticino

Swiss people of Italian descent